Lavassaare is a borough in Audru Parish, Pärnu County, in southwestern Estonia. It had a population of 539 on 1 January 2009 and an area of 8.00 km².

Lavassaare is home to the Estonian Railway Museum at Lavassaare, a museum dedicated to the history of the narrow-track railway in Estonia.

See also
Lake Lavassaare

References

External links
 

Boroughs and small boroughs in Estonia
Audru Parish
Former municipalities of Estonia